Browett, Lindley & Co was a British engineering company established in 1886, which manufactured stationary steam engines used to power cotton mills and early power stations.

The company built the Sandon Engine Works, Clifford Street, Patricroft in 1890. The works was later extended in 1901 by the addition of a new erecting shop and boilerhouse.

In 1902, the company supplied eight large triple expansion steam engines, driving 775 kW Mather & Platt dynamos, to Salford Corporation for its Frederick Road generating station.

The company built engines for several Lancashire cotton mills including Alder Mill, Leigh, and Fernhurst Mill, Chadderton.

The Sandon Engine Works closed in 1921.

In 1931, the company was bought by George Cohen, Sons and Company.

References

Engineering companies of England
Companies based in Salford
Defunct manufacturing companies of the United Kingdom
Steam engine manufacturers
1886 establishments in England
Manufacturing companies established in 1886
Manufacturing companies disestablished in 1931
1931 disestablishments in England
1931 mergers and acquisitions